Lundi Msenge (born 21 January 1999) is a South African rugby union player for the  in the Currie Cup. His regular position is wing.

Msenge was named in the  side for the 2022 Currie Cup Premier Division.

References

South African rugby union players
Living people
Rugby union wings
Pumas (Currie Cup) players
1999 births